This article lists the people holding the office of either the  mayor of Danzig or the city mayor of Danzig, between 1308 and 1945, as well as the city mayor of Gdańsk from 1945 to the present day (or holders of the equivalent offices during communism).

Historical outline 
1224 – Gdańsk received city rights (with Lübeck law)
1308 – Teutonic takeover of Danzig (Gdańsk)
1454 – Danzig reclaimed by the Crown of the Kingdom of Poland
1569 – Danzig fully reintegrated along with the remainder of Royal Prussia into the Polish–Lithuanian Commonwealth
1793 – Danzig lost in the Second Partition of Poland to Prussia, but not to Germany (the Holy Roman Empire)
1806 – Danzig a Napoleonic free city and a condominium of Prussia and the Duchy of Warsaw
1815 – Danzig reclaimed entirely by Prussia, but not as part of Germany (the German Confederation)
1866 – Danzig a part of Germany (North German Confederation)
1871 – Danzig a part of German Empire
1918 – Danzig a free city in a union with the Second Polish Republic concerning foreign, military, customs, rail and postal affairs
1939 – Danzig illegally annexed by Germany 
1945 – Danzig (as Gdańsk) fully reclaimed by Poland

Mayors or city mayors of Danzig

Teutonic Order
Note that dates overlap. This is because there were four mayors. First was titled president and had highest power, the rest were named second mayor, third mayor and fourth mayor. After a year the president gave power to the second mayor, and became the fourth mayor. The process repeated itself, interrupted by deaths and elections of new mayors.

1342–1347 – Dettloff von der Osten
1342–1354 – Henrich Burmeister der Ältere
1346–1355 – Steffen von der Osten
1354–1374 – Hillebrand Müntzer
1356–1360 – Johan von Stein
1359–1372 – Johann Wallrabe der Ältere
1361–1362 – Casper Bock
1362–1390 – Gottschalck Naase
1368–1387 – Paul Jann
1372–1385 – Johann Wallrabe der Jüngere
1379–1386 – Johann Wackaw
1381–1384 – Nicklaus Gottsknecht
1384–1392 – Herman Rolberg
1392–1405 – Reinhold Hittfeld
1395–1399 – Lubbert Haacke
1399–1404 – Peter Fürstenau
1402–1418 – Tideman Huxer
1405–1411 – Conrad Letzkau
1407–1410 – Peter Vorraht
1408–1411 – Arend or Arnold Hecht
1411–1417 – Herman Hittfeld
1412–1413 – Albrecht Dödorff
1413–1430 – Gert von der Becke
1415–1416 – Steffen Plötzker
(before 1436) – Nicklaus Rogge
1419–1433 – Johann Beisener
1430–1441 – Peter Holste
1433–1446 – Lucas Meckelfeld
1433–1443 – Heinrich Vorraht
1436–1449 – Meinert Cölmer
1442–1456 – Martin Cremon
1445–1456 – Albrecht Hexer
1447–1480 – Reinhold Niederhoff
1452–1462 – Herman Stargardt

Kingdom of Poland
Teutonic Order lost Danzig to Poland after 1454, during the Thirteen Years' War, and by the Second Peace of Thorn (1466)

1454–1461 – Wilhelm Jordan
1457–1461 – Jacob Falcke
1461–1475 – Johann von Scheren
1462–1478 – Johann von Walde
1462–1478 – Johann Veere
1470–1483 – Philipp Bischoff
1477–1483 – Johann Angermünde
1479–1501 – Johann Ferber
1483–1485 – Marten Bock
1484–1502 – George Buck
1484–1490 – Johann Schewecke
1489–1505 – Henrich Falcke
1492–1501 – Henrich von Süchten
1502–1513 – George Mand
1503–1512 – Johann Schewecke der Jüngere
1504–1513 – Matthias Zimmerman
1506–1507 – Antoni Backelman
1510–1526 – Eberhard Ferber
1513–1525 – Greger Brand
1514–1524 – Henrich Wiese
1517–1535 – Philipp Bischoff
1524–1529 – Matthias Lange
1525–1538 – Cordt von Süchten
1526–1535 – Edward Niederhoff
1526–1554 – Johann von Werden
1531–1547 – George Schewecke
1536–1539 – Peter Behme
1538–1549 – Barthell Brand
1540–1560 – Dr. Tiedemann Giese (nephew of the bishop Tiedemann Giese)
1550–1554 – Johann Stutte

Polish–Lithuanian Commonwealth
Polish-Lithuanian Commonwealth begun in 1569 with the Union of Lublin, which transformed the personal union of Poland and Lithuania into a real union and also reintegrated Pomerelia as part of Royal Prussia into the Crown of the Kingdom of Poland

1548–1577 – Johann Brandes
1555–1588 – Constantin Feber
1557–1578 – Johann Proite
1558–1576 – Georg Kleefeld
1577–1585 – Reinhold Möllner
1578–1592 – Georg Rosenberg
1581–1619 – Johann von der Linde
1586–1602 – Daniel Zierenberg
1589–1605 – Constantin Giese
1592–1612 – Gerhard Brandes
1603–1611 – Johann Thorbecke
1605–1614 – Barthell Schachtmann
1612–1616 – Andreas Borkman
1612–1625 – Johann Speymann
1615–1617 – Barthell Brandt
1617–1629 – Arnold von Holten
1618–1636 – Eggert von Kempen
1619–1635 – Valentin von Bodeck
1626–1620 – Ernst Kroll
1630–1642 – Johann Zierenberg
1630–1631 – Adrian von der Linde
1632–1654 – Constantin Ferber
1636–1644 – Hans Rogge
1637–1639 – Johann Ernst Schröder
1640–1649 – Nicklas Pahl
1643–1644 – Elert von Bobart
1645–1646 – Daniel Falcke
1645–1682 – Adrian von der Linde
1647–1654 – Henrich Freder
1650–1665 – Friederich Ehler
1655–1663 – Nathanaël Schmieden
1655–1673 – George von Bömelen
1664–1675 – Nicklas von Bodeck
1666–1685 – Gabriel Krumhausen
1677–1701 – Christian Schröder
1677–1686 – Daniel Proite
1683–1700 – Barbiel Schuhmann
1686–1704 – Constantin Ferber
1687–1691 – Constantin Ferber
1692–1707 – Johann Ernst Schmieden
1700–1707 – Constantin Ferber
1702–1707 – Reinhold Wieder
1704–1722 – Andreas Borkman
1707–1716 – Friedrich Gottlieb Engelcke
1708–1712 – Joachim Hoyge
1708–1740 – Gabriel von Bömeln
1712–1721 – Ernst von der Linde
1716–1710 – Carl Ernst Bauer
1720–1745 – Johann Gottfried von Disseldorff
1722–1720 – Salomon Gabriel Schumann
1723–1734 – Gottfried von Bentzmann
1730–1739 – Carl Groddeck
1735–1757 – Johann Wahl
1740–1753 – Carl Gottlieb Ehler
1741–1746 – Joachim Jacob Schwacher
1746–1748 – Johann Carl Schwartzwald
1746–1755 – Nathanael Gottfried Ferber
1750–1753 – Fridrich Krüger
1754      – Christian Gabriel von Schröder
1754      – Michael Schmidt
1756      – Johann Kenner
?         – Johann Ernst von der Linde
1762–1776 – Gottlieb G. Weickhmann
1763–1767 – Daniel Gralath
1777      – Gottfried Schwartz
1787      – Johann von Bentzmann
1790      – Zernecke
1793      – Eduard Friedrich von Conradi

Kingdom of Prussia
1794      – von Lindenow

Free City of Danzig (Napoleonic)
1807–1808 – Carl Friedrich von Gralath
1808–1810 – Gottlieb Hufeland
1810–1814 – Johann Willhelm Wernsdorff
1814–1849 – Joachim Heinrich von Weickhmann

Kingdom of Prussia and German Empire
1850–1862 – Carl August von Groddeck
1863–1891 – Leopold von Winter
1891–1896 – Dr. Karl Adolf Baumbach
1896–1902 – Dr. Clemens von Delbrück
1903–1910 – 
1910–1919 – Heinrich Heinrich Scholtz

Free City of Danzig
Free City of Danzig created by the Treaty of Versailles

1920–1931 – Dr. Heinrich Sahm (since 1920 President of Senate)
1931–1933 – Ernst Ziehm (President of Senate)
1933–1934 – Hermann Rauschning (President of Senate)
1934–1939 – Arthur Greiser (President of Senate)
1939 – Albert Forster (Head of State)

World War II
Free City occupied by Nazi Germany and incorporated into the Reichsgau Danzig-West Prussia
1939–1945 –

City mayors of Gdańsk and equivalents

City mayors of Gdańsk 1945–1950
1945–1946 – Franciszek Kotus-Jankowski
1946–1949 – Bolesław Nowicki
1949–1950 – Piotr Stolarek

Presidents of Presidium of the City National Council of Gdańsk 1950–1973
Between 1950–1973 functions of the city mayor of Gdańsk and president of the City National Council of Gdańsk were combined into one office.

1950–1953 – Piotr Stolarek
1953–1954 – Stanisław Schmidt
1954–1958 – Julian Cybulski
1958–1963 – Stanisław Schmidt
1963–1969 – Tadeusz Bejm
1969–1973 – Jan Mikołajew

City mayors of Gdańsk 1973–1990

1973–1977 – Andrzej Kaznowski
1977–1981 – Jerzy Młynarczyk
1981–1989 – Kazimierz Rynkowski
1989–1990 – Jerzy Pasiński

City mayors of Gdańsk from 1990
1990–1991 – Jacek Starościak
1991–1994 – Franciszek Jamroż
1994–1998 – Tomasz Posadzki
1998–2019 – Paweł Adamowicz
from 2019 – Aleksandra Dulkiewicz

Speakers of the municipal legislature

Presidents of the Volkstag (1920-1939)

1920–1921: Wilhelm Reinhard
1921-1921: Adalbert Mathaei
1921–1923: Adolf Treichel (first term)
1923–1924: Julius Gehl (first term)
1924–1926: Adolf Treichel (second term)
1926–1928: Alfred Semrau
1928–1930: Fritz Spill
1930–1931: Julius Gehl (second term)
1931–1933: Wilhelm von Wnuck (first term)
1933-1933: Franz Potrykus
1933–1936: Wilhelm von Wnuck (second term)
1937–1939: Edmund Beyl

Chairpersons of the City National Council of Gdańsk 1945–1950 
1945–1948 – Alfred Kossakowski
1948–1949 – Leon Srebrnik
1949–1950 – Bolesław Gemza

Presidents of the Presidium of the City National Council of Gdańsk 1950–1973
Between 1950–1973 functions of the city mayor of Gdańsk and chairperson of the City National Council of Gdańsk were combined into one office.
1950–1953 – Piotr Stolarek
1953–1954 – Stanisław Schmidt
1954–1958 – Julian Cybulski
1958–1963 – Stanisław Schmidt
1963–1969 – Tadeusz Bejm
1969–1973 – Jan Mikołajew

Chairpersons of the City National Council of Gdańsk 1973–1990
1973–1977 – Adam Nowotnik
1977–1981 – Jarosław Polski
1981–1984 – Wiesław Julian Gruszkowski
1984–1986 – Eugeniusz Wójcik
1986–1990 – Janusz Lewiński

Chairpersons of the City Council of Gdańsk from 1990
1990 – Franciszek Jamroż
1990–1994 – Andrzej Januszajtis
1994–1998 – Paweł Adamowicz
1998–2001 – Elżbieta Grabarek-Bartoszewicz
2001–2018 – Bogdan Oleszek
from 2018 – Agnieszka Owczarczak

See also
List of Gdańsk aristocratic families
History of Gdańsk
Timeline of Gdańsk

External links
List at roots.gdansk.pl

History of Gdańsk
Gdańsk
Gdańsk
Mayors